'Girl Overboard' is a 1937 American mystery film directed by Sidney Salkow from a screenplay by Tristram Tupper based on a story by Sara Elizabeth Rodger. The film stars Gloria Stuart, Walter Pidgeon, and Billy Burrud, and was released on February 28, 1937.

Cast list
 Gloria Stuart as Mary Chesbrooke
 Walter Pidgeon as Paul Stacey
 Billy Burrud as Bobby Stacey
 Hobart Cavanaugh as Joe Gray
 Gerald Oliver Smith as Harvey
 Sidney Blackmer as Alex LeMaire
 Jack Smart as Wilbur Jenkins
 David Oliver as Dutch
 Charlotte Wynters as Molly Shane
 Russell Hicks as Sam LeMaire
 R. E. O'Connor as Sergeant Hatton
 Edward McNamara as Captain Murphy
 Charles Wilson as Editor
 Selmer Jackson as Captain Hartman

References

External links
 
 
 

Films directed by Sidney Salkow
1937 mystery films
1937 films
American mystery films
Universal Pictures films
American black-and-white films
Films scored by John Leipold
1930s American films
1930s English-language films